Haselbacher See is a lake in Leipzig (Saxony)/ Altenburger Land (Thuringia), Germany. At an elevation of 151 m, its surface area is 3.35 km². The lake is a part of the Central German Lake District.

Lakes of Saxony
Lakes of Thuringia
LHaselbacherSee